Agrarian structure is the pattern of land (area group) distribution among landholders (agricultural households).

References

Agriculture